In the United States, trademark law includes a fair use defense, sometimes called "trademark fair use" to distinguish it from the better-known fair use doctrine in copyright. Fair use of trademarks is more limited than that which exists in the context of copyright.

Many trademarks are adapted from words or symbols that are common to the culture, as Apple, Inc. using a trademark that is based upon the apple. Other trademarks are invented by the mark owner (such as Kodak) and have no common use until introduced by the owner. Courts have recognized that ownership of a trademark or service mark cannot be used to prevent others from using the word or symbol in accord with its plain and ordinary meaning, such as if the trademark is a descriptive word or common symbol such as a pine tree. As a result, the less distinctive or original the trademark, the less able the trademark owner will be to control how it is used.

For the potentially infringing use of a trademark or service mark, fair use by a non-owner of the mark falls under two categories:
 Nominative fair use: referencing a mark to identify the actual goods and services that the trademark holder identifies with the mark. For example, it is not trademark infringement to refer to a printer produced by Casio as a "Casio printer".
 Descriptive fair use: Using a descriptive mark in an ordinary, descriptive manner to describe a product or service. For example, describing a component within a dehumidifier as "honeycomb-shaped" was a fair use of a registered trademark for HONEYCOMBE dehumidifiers.  In other words, for descriptive fair use to arise, the following must be true:
Plaintiff owns a mark that is descriptive of its goods or services (i.e., it immediately conveys information regarding quality, characteristic, function, feature, or intended use of the goods/services).  If Plaintiff's mark is suggestive (i.e., it requires thought or imagination to understand the nature of the underlying goods or services, such as TIDE for laundry detergent), arbitrary (i.e., a word or phrase that exists in language, but has no relation to the goods or services, such as APPLE for computers), or fanciful (i.e., a new word, created as a trademark, such as KODAK for cameras), descriptive fair use does not apply.
Defendant uses the mark as a descriptive word or phrase (i.e., to accurately describe something).  If Defendant uses the mark as a trademark (i.e., a brand, product name, company name, etc.) or if Defendant uses the term in a suggestive manner, it is not descriptive fair use.

Nominative fair use of a mark may also occur within the context of comparative advertising.

Under U.S. Supreme Court precedent, the fair use defense in trademark law is not precluded by the possibility of confusion. However, courts may consider the possibility of confusion in analyzing whether a use is fair or not. Intent to show confusion is also relevant; hence, as a general rule the trademark should be used no more than necessary for the legitimate purpose. By the same token, use of a word mark is preferred to a logo, and a word mark in the same style of type as surrounding text is preferred to a word mark in its trademarked distinctive type.

See also
 Nominative use
 Rogers v. Grimaldi and the Rogers test

References

United States trademark law
First Amendment to the United States Constitution
Fair use